Caroline Ellis (born 12 October 1950) is an English actress. She is best known for her role in  Only Fools and Horses as Michelle and her other roles in a 1968 TV adaptation of the Sherlock Holmes story The Boscombe Valley Mystery, Jill Rowles in the Southern TV adventure series Freewheelers in 1972, and a "Brummie" holiday camper (Glad) in the raunchy 1977 comedy film Confessions from a Holiday Camp.

Ellis was best known to American audiences for her role as the character Joy in The Bugaloos (1970).

Ellis is divorced and the mother of one daughter, Sasha, born in 1985. As of 2006, Ellis was no longer acting but was working in real estate in Spain, where she lived with her daughter.

Filmography

Film

Television

References

External links 
 
 The Bugaloos: Caroline "Joy" Ellis

1950 births
Living people
Actresses from London
English television actresses
English film actresses